Jagnandan Singh (11 January 1929 – 9 February 2016) was a Kenyan field hockey player. He competed at the 1960 Summer Olympics.

References

External links
 

1929 births
2016 deaths
Kenyan male field hockey players
Olympic field hockey players of Kenya
Field hockey players at the 1960 Summer Olympics
Sportspeople from Ludhiana
Indian emigrants to Kenya
Sportspeople from Nairobi
Kenyan people of Indian descent
Kenyan people of Punjabi descent
Panjab University alumni
Indian emigrants to the United Kingdom
Kenyan emigrants to the United Kingdom
British sportspeople of Indian descent
British people of Punjabi descent